Shirley M. (née Collier) Hooper-Garcia (November 5, 1935 – October 24, 2014) was an American politician who served as the 18th New Mexico Secretary of State.

Early life and education 
Born in Meadow, Texas, Hooper moved to Lovington, New Mexico with her family in 1939. She graduated from Lovington High School in 1953 and then from the New Mexico Real Estate Institute. She also attended New Mexico Junior College in 1989.

Career 
Hooper served as secretary of the speaker of the New Mexico House of Representatives and was assistant chief clerk. Hooper was legal secretary to two judges of the New Mexico Court of Appeals. In 1988, she was elected clerk of Lea County, New Mexico. Hooper served as the Secretary of State of New Mexico from 1979 to 1982.

Death 
Hooper died at her home in Roswell, New Mexico.

References

1935 births
2014 deaths
People from Lovington, New Mexico
People from Roswell, New Mexico
People from Terry County, Texas
New Mexico Junior College alumni
New Mexico Democrats
County clerks in New Mexico
Women in New Mexico politics
Secretaries of State of New Mexico
20th-century American politicians
20th-century American women politicians
21st-century American women